Rock lily is a common name for several plants and may refer to:

Arthropodium cirratum, native to New Zealand
Dendrobium speciosum, native to Australia